Elena Anatolyevna Tchaikovskaia, also spelled as Chaykovskaya or Chaikovskaia (née Osipova; born 30 December 1939) is a Russian figure skating coach, choreographer, and former competitor for the Soviet Union. She runs a skating school at the Yantar Sports Center, built in 2010 in the Strogino District west of Moscow. She coaches in collaboration with Vladimir Kotin, her former pupil.

Biography
Elena Tchaikovskaia was born in Moscow in a family of theatre actors.  Her father worked in Mossovet Theatre. Since childhood she was prepared to become an actor, and even starred with her father Anatoliy Osipov in several Soviet films, such as Schastlivyy reys. She had unhealthy lungs, so her father took her to the ice rink, believing skating would help improve her health. After school she decided to attend the Russian Academy of Theatre Arts (GITIS), ballet master faculty. In 1957, she became a Soviet champion in single skating. In 1960, she retired from competitions and started working as choreographer and later as a coach. Since 1997, she has served as the Russian Olympic committee's main coach. She also coaches the national figure skating team.

Among her current and former students are:
 Vladimir Kotin
 Vladimir Kovalev
 Natalia Linichuk / Gennadi Karponossov
 Lyudmila Pakhomova / Aleksandr Gorshkov
 Margarita Drobiazko / Povilas Vanagas
 Maria Butyrskaya
 Viktoria Volchkova
 Sergei Davydov
 Andrei Lezin
 Kristina Gorshkova / Vitali Butikov
 Alexandra Maksimova / Egor Maistrov
 Emma Hagieva

The Russian Academy of Theatre Arts has a special faculty for former sportsmen and figure skaters who are willing to become coaches. It is headed by Elena Tchaikovskaia and was formerly headed by Tchaikovskaia's student Lyudmila Pakhomova. Tchaikovskaia also heads a skating school in Moscow called "Skate of Tchaikovskaia".

Tchaikovskaia was twice awarded with the Order of the Red Banner of Labour and once with the Lithuanian Order of Gediminas for her successful work with Margarita Drobiazko and Povilas Vanagas. Drobiazko and Vanagas, as well as Julia Soldatova and Kristina Oblasova trained in "Skate of Tchaikovskaia" school.

Views
In 2023, she stated that the doping case involving Kamila Valieva is the result of "political games" instigated by the West:

Coaching philosophy
Famous for her ice dancing pairs, in 2007, she stated that personally thinks that single skating is far more important and difficult. She is more involved in single skating, though says that she may return to ice dancing someday.

She has written several books about training of figure skaters, for example, Konek Udachi (lit. "A skate of luck"), which was published in 1994. In 2007, a documentary about her was released in Russia titled Her Ice Majesty. Elena Tchaikovskaia directed by Oleg Moroseev.

Results

Publications

References

Navigation

1939 births
Living people
Russian figure skating coaches
Russian female single skaters
Figure skating choreographers
Figure skaters from Moscow
Soviet female single skaters
Russian Academy of Theatre Arts alumni
Merited Coaches of the Soviet Union
Honoured Coaches of Russia
Soviet figure skating coaches
Female sports coaches